Sushila Swar (Nepali: सुशला स्वर)(daughter of Ganesh Bahadhur Swar and Bindra Devi Swar) is a Nepalese politician. She was elected to the Pratinidhi Sabha in the 1999 election on behalf of the Nepali Congress. When the Nepali Congress was divided, she sided with the Nepali Congress (Democratic)

References

Living people
Nepali Congress politicians from Sudurpashchim Province
Nepali Congress (Democratic) politicians
21st-century Nepalese women politicians
21st-century Nepalese politicians
Year of birth missing (living people)
Nepal MPs 1999–2002
20th-century Nepalese women politicians
20th-century Nepalese politicians